Chlorocypha molindica is a species of damselfly in the family Chlorocyphidae. It is found in Burundi, the Republic of the Congo, the Democratic Republic of the Congo, Rwanda, and Uganda. Its natural habitats are subtropical or tropical moist lowland forests, subtropical or tropical moist montane forests, and rivers.

Sources

Chlorocyphidae
Insects described in 1948
Taxonomy articles created by Polbot
Taxobox binomials not recognized by IUCN